Diana Riba i Giner (born 21 February 1975) is a Catalan politician from Spain and a member of the European Parliament for Spain.

Early life
Riba was born on 21 February 1975 in Barcelona, Catalonia, Spain. She has a degree in pedagogy from the University of Barcelona.

Career
Riba started her career at the Center for Initiatives and Research Centers in the Mediterranean Foundation (CIREM). Later she worked for La Caixa Foundation co-ordinating and managing conferences on cinema and literature at the CaixaForum. She was a cultural programmer for the 2004 Universal Forum of Cultures held in Barcelona. She ran the Pati dels Llibres book shop in Sant Cugat del Vallès between 2008 and 2019. She was treasurer of the Catalan Council of the Children's and Youth Books (Consell Català del Llibre Infantil i Juvenil).

Riba is a member of the Castellers in Sant Cugat and the Catalan Association for Civil Rights (Associació Catalana pels Drets Civils). In December 2018 she was chosen by the Republican Left of Catalonia to be its number two candidate at the 2019 European Parliament election in Spain. She contested the election as an Ahora Repúblicas electoral alliance candidate in Spain and was elected to the European Parliament.

Personal life
Riba is the partner of jailed Catalan minister Raül Romeva. They have two children – Elda and Noah.

Electoral history

References

1975 births
Living people
Ahora Repúblicas MEPs
Women politicians from Catalonia
MEPs for Spain 2019–2024
21st-century women MEPs for Spain
People from Barcelona
Republican Left of Catalonia MEPs
University of Barcelona alumni